Vüqar Aslanov (born 20 March 1976) is an Azerbaijani wrestler. He competed in the men's Greco-Roman 74 kg at the 2004 Summer Olympics.

References

External links
 

1976 births
Living people
Azerbaijani male sport wrestlers
Olympic wrestlers of Azerbaijan
Wrestlers at the 2004 Summer Olympics
Sportspeople from Baku
21st-century Azerbaijani people